Paul Terrance Miles (born 13 February 1963) is an Australian politician. He was a Liberal member of the Western Australian Legislative Assembly from 2008 to 2017, representing Wanneroo. He won the seat after defeating sitting Labor MLA Dianne Guise. Miles was appointed Parliamentary Secretary to the Minister for Commerce in 2013 to 2016, in the Barnett Ministry. In the dying months of the Barnett Government he was made Minister for Local Government, Minister for Community Services, Minister for Seniors and Volunteering, and Minister for Youth in September 2016.

Biography
Miles was born in the United Kingdom to parents, Beryl and Alan Miles. They migrated to Perth, Australia in 1970. He is one of five siblings, and grew up in the suburbs of Balcatta and Girrawheen.  

Miles attended Osborne Park Primary School and Later Montrose Primary School in Girrawheen.

Political career
Prior to his election the Legislative Assembly, Miles was a local government Councillor for the North Ward of the City of Wanneroo. Miles contested the 2005 Western Australian state election unsuccessfully and then successfully in 2008 and 2013. 

He was defeated in 2017 by Sabine Winton, suffering an 18.2% swing against him, one of the largest in entire State, and was one of 7 sitting Ministers to be defeated.

He contested the seat again, for the 5th time, at the 2021 State election. He was the only former MP who was defeated in 2017 to be recycled as a candidate for the upcoming election. He did not win the seat back.

In October 2021, he was elected again to the City of Wanneroo, this time to the Central-East Ward.

References

1963 births
Living people
Liberal Party of Australia members of the Parliament of Western Australia
Members of the Western Australian Legislative Assembly
21st-century Australian politicians